William West McNamara (born March 31, 1965) is an American film and television actor.

Personal life
Born in Dallas, Texas, McNamara is the son of a Ford Motor Company employee and an interior designer. He attended Salisbury School, Columbia University, and studied at the Lee Strasberg Institute in New York.

Career
He appeared in the feature films Texasville, Stella, Copycat, Surviving the Game, and Stealing Home. On television, he portrayed Montgomery Clift in Liz: The Elizabeth Taylor Story and Ricky Nelson in Nightmares & Dreamscapes: From the Stories of Stephen King, had a regular role on the Showtime series Beggars and Choosers, was featured in the television movies Doing Time on Maple Drive and Wildflower (CableACE Award nomination), and appeared in NYPD Blue and Law & Order: SVU, among other television series.

Activism
McNamara is an animal rights activist and vegan. He got his start rescuing cats, dogs, and horses, and now travels the world advocating animal rights. McNamara has produced several documentaries, including the Nat Geo Wild Network: Animal Intervention, an exposé on the exotic animal industry in the United States.

Filmography
Opera (1987) – Stefano
Stealing Home (1988) – Billy Wyatt (teenager)
The Beat (1988) – Billy Kane
Dream a Little Dream (1989) – Joel
Stella (1990) – Pat Robbins
Texasville (1990) – Dickie Jackson
Wildflower (1991) - Sammy Perkins
Aspen Extreme (1993) – Todd Pounds
Extreme Justice (1993) – Mark Franklin (surfer, uncredited in film credits)
Chasers (1994) – Eddie Devane
Surviving the Game (1994) – Derek Wolfe Jr.
Radio Inside (1994) – Matthew Anderson
Copycat (1995) – Peter Foley
Storybook (1995) – Prince Arthur
Girl in the Cadillac (1995) – Rick
Snitch (1996) – Shakley
Dead Girl (1996) – Damon
Natural Enemy (1996) – Jeremy
Stag (1997) – Jon DiCapri
The Deli (1997) – Kevin
Glam (1997) – Sonny Daye
The Brylcreem Boys (1997) – Sam Gunn
Sweet Jane (1998) – Stan Bleeker
Something to Believe In (1998) – Mike
Ringmaster (1998) – Troy Davenport
Implicated (1999) – Tom Baker
Paper Bullets (1999) – Laurence McCoy
Knockout (2000) – Michael DeMarco
Just Sue Me (2000) – Daniel
The Calling (a.k.a. Man of Faith) (2002) – Bobby Murky
The Kings of Brooklyn (2004) – Chris Parmel
The Iron Man (2006) – Gerard
The Still Life (2007) – Teacher
April Moon (2007) – David
A Dance for Bethany (2007) – James Fisher
The Grift (2008) – Hugh Babcock
The Bleeding (2009) – Dan Williams
The Ascent (2010) – Joel
The Legend of Hell's Gate: An American Conspiracy (2010) – Jones Moon
Cut! (2012) – Bryan Wolff
Dry (2014) – Dr Brown
Truth (2015)
Last Man Club (2016) – Joe Scanlin
The Secrets of Emily Blair (2016) – Mr. Regan
Happenstance (2017) – Bodhi
Opus of an Angel (2018) - Dr. Stephen Murphy 
Rottentail (2018) – Jake Mulligan
The 2nd (2020) – Jalil

Television
Secret of the Sahara (1988 mini-series) – Philip
Island Son (1989 series) – Sam
Wildflower (1991) – Sammy Perkins
Doing Time on Maple Drive (1992) – Matt Carter
Silk Stalkings ("The Brotherhood" episode, aired 1/9/1992) – Clay Edwards
Honor Thy Mother (1992) – Chris
Sworn to Vengeance (1993) – Michael Burke
Liz: The Elizabeth Taylor Story (1995) – Montgomery Clift
Perversions of Science ("Given the Heir" episode, aired 6/18/1997) – Nick Boyer
Natural Enemy (1997) – Jeremy
Welcome to Paradox ("Blue Champagne" episode, aired 11/2/1998) – Q.M. Cooper
Brimstone ("Encore" episode, aired 11/6/1998) – Gilbert Jax
Beggars and Choosers (1999–2001 series) – Brad Advail
The Outer Limits ("Better Luck Next Time" episode, aired 8/20/1999) – Kimble
The Hunger ("Approaching Desdemona" episode, aired 2/6/2000) – Kent Johanssen
Time Lapse (2001) – Clayton Pirce
Trapped (2001) – C. Whitmore Evans
Law & Order: Special Victims Unit ("Pandora" episode) (2003) – Detective Sam Bishop
NYPD Blue (1 February 2005 episode) – Richard Pancava
McBride: Murder Past Midnight (2005) – Tony Harriman
American Black Beauty (2005) – Wilford
Nightmares and Dreamscapes: From the Stories of Stephen King (1 episode) (2006) – Ricky Nelson
Beyond the Break (2 episodes) (2007) – Richard
The Wrong Roommate (2016) – Mark
Running Away (2017) – Richard

References

External links

1965 births
American male film actors
American male television actors
Columbia University alumni
Lee Strasberg Theatre and Film Institute alumni
Living people
Male actors from Dallas
20th-century American male actors
21st-century American male actors